Cutler Township is a township in Franklin County, Kansas, United States.  As of the 2000 census, its population was 856.

Geography

The streams of East Branch Mosquito Creek and West Branch Mosquito Creek run through this township.

Transportation
Cutler Township contains one airport or landing strip, Dempsay Farm Airport.

References
 USGS Geographic Names Information System (GNIS)

External links
 City-Data.com

Townships in Franklin County, Kansas
Townships in Kansas